The TM 31-210 Improvised Munitions Handbook is a 256 pages United States Army technical manual intended for the United States Army Special Forces. It was first published in 1969 by the Department of the Army. Like many other U.S. military manuals dealing with improvised explosive devices (IEDs) and unconventional warfare, it was declassified and released into the public domain as a result of provisions such as the Freedom of Information Act (FOIA), and is now freely available to the public in both electronic and printed formats. 

The manual describes the manufacture of various types of ordnances from readily available materials, from junk piles, common household chemicals and supplies purchased from regular stores. 

The manual is one of the best official references on improvised explosive devices (IEDs) manufacturing, and some of the weapons described in it have been used against U.S. troops by foreign troops. For example, the hand-grenade-in-a-can trap was used against U.S. troops in Vietnam, and the water-in-a-bucket timer was used by Afghan guerrillas to launch rockets against U.S. military bases.

Sections 
The TM 31-210 manual consists of seven main sections: 

 Explosives and propellants (including igniters)
 Mines and grenades
 Small arms weapons and ammunition
 Mortars and rockets
 Incendiary devices
 Fuses, detonators & delay mechanisms
 Miscellaneous

The miscellaneous section deals with the production of various types of trigger mechanisms (pressure, pressure release, traction, etc.), a makeshift precision balance, electric batteries, makeshift bulletproof barricades and more. The manual ends with two appendices, which briefly deal with the properties of some primary and secondary explosives.

Popular culture
The TM 31-210 manual appeared as an "easter egg" in the 1995 CGI animated film, Toy Story. In the scene where Woody is trapped under a blue plastic box in Sid's bedroom, it's possible to see behind him a document titled "TM 31-210 Improvised Interrogation Handbook", a clear reference to the actual document.

References

External links

Special Operations Forces of the United States
1969 books
United States Army Field Manuals